Tra-la-la is a song composed by George and Ira Gershwin for the 1922 Broadway show For Goodness' Sake. However, it was never performed in the show. It was later performed in the 1951 American film An American in Paris by Gene Kelly and Oscar Levant. In An American in Paris, it was listed as Tra-la-la (This Time It's Really Love).

References

Songs with music by George Gershwin
Songs with lyrics by Ira Gershwin